Fiona Jane Hyslop (born 1 August 1964) is a Scottish politician who served as Cabinet Secretary for Economy, Fair Work and Culture from 2020 to 2021. A member of the Scottish National Party (SNP), she has been a Member of the Scottish Parliament (MSP) for the Linlithgow constituency since 2011, having represented the Lothians region from 1999 to 2011.

Hyslop was born in Ayrshire and spent her early years in England, before moving back to Scotland. She attended the University of Glasgow, where she earned a Masters of Art in Economic History and Sociology. She moved to Edinburgh and worked for the Standard Life Assurance Company. Hyslop joined the SNP in 1986 and spent her spare time campaigning in local elections. She unsuccessfully ran for the British House of Commons for both the Edinburgh Leith and Edinburgh Central constituencies in the 90s. In 1999, she was elected to the Scottish Parliament as an additional member for the Lothian regions.

After the SNP's election victory in 2007, Hyslop was appointed by First Minister Alex Salmond as Cabinet Secretary for Education and Lifelong Learning, but was later sacked following threats of a motion of no confidence in 2009. She was demoted to junior Minister for Culture and External Affairs, which was later promoted to cabinet-level in 2011. She served as Culture Secretary from 2011 to 2020, where she then added economy on to her portfolio, as Cabinet Secretary for Economy, Fair Work and Culture. In 2021, following First Minister Nicola Sturgeon's cabinet reshuffle, she announced her intention to step down, having served 14 years in government.

Early life and education 
Fiona Jane Hyslop was born in Irvine, Ayrshire, on 1 August 1964. At the age of three she moved to Grantham, England, where it made her feel Scotland was a "distinct country". Her dad died at a young age and her mum, a midwife, was left as a single parent to two children. Following the death of Hyslop's father, her family returned to Ayrshire where she attended Alloway Primary School and later Ayr Academy. In the 1970s, she began to have an interest in politics through her mum's friends, who were members of the Scottish National Party.

When Hyslop was 14, her mum married her step-father, a general practitioner, who had two children. Her step-brother was hospital catering manager and her step-sister was in the police, giving Hyslop a real sense of the importance of public services. Her political awareness was enhanced in the 1980s, during the Thatcher years, to what she describes as the years Margaret Thatcher "attacked" public services.

Hyslop studied social sciences at the University of Glasgow and earned an Masters of Art in Economic History and Sociology. She also earned a Post-graduate Diploma in Industrial Administration from the Scottish College of Textiles. She moved to Edinburgh, where she worked for the Standard Life Assurance Company from 1986 to 1999.

Early political years 

Hyslop helped campaign for the Scottish National Party at a local by-election even though she was not a member. In 1986, she eventually joined the Scottish National Party. She described herself as never being a "joiner" and joined the SNP after she read their manifesto, and felt that Scottish independence most suited her interests. She became the party's election agent for three regional candidates in the 1988 Scottish local elections and managed to win a seat.

Whilst working in Edinburgh, Hyslop spent her spare time campaigning for the SNP and was an active member of the Young Scots Nationalists, the SNP's youth wing. She worked along with Charlie Reid of the Proclaimers and Angus Robertson. She worked on motions to move the SNP to a more centre-left, social democratic party. Hyslop became Vice Convener for Policy and served on the SNP Executive Committee.

Hyslop stood as a candidate in the 1988 Edinburgh District Council elections, and in the 1990 and 1994 Lothian Regional Council elections. She also stood as candidate for Edinburgh Leith and Edinburgh Central in the 1992 and 1997 UK General Elections respectively.

Member of the Scottish Parliament 

Following the re-establishment of the Scottish Parliament, Hyslop stood on the SNP's additional list for the Lothian region and was elected in 1999. Her first years as Member of the Scottish Parliament, strengthened her views on Scottish independence after seeing the lack of powers the parliament really had.

In 2003, Hyslop sought re-election to the 2nd Scottish Parliament, this time as a candidate for the Linlithgow constituency. Although she failed to win this constituency, she was re-elected from the Lothian regional list. She felt frustrated by the lack of influence the parliament had over the Iraq war and believed Scotland's place in the world "would be far better strengthened by independence."

Hyslop, once again, ran for the Linlithgow constituency in the 2007 election. She lost the seat, again, but increased her vote share and retained her seat on the Lothian list.

Education Secretary 
The SNP formed a minority government following the 2007 election, with Alex Salmond as First Minister. Salmond appointed Hyslop to his cabinet as the Cabinet Secretary for Education and Lifelong Learning, a portfolio she had previously shadowed. As Education Secretary, she passed the Graduate Endowment Abolition (Scotland) Act 2008, an Act of the Scottish Parliament to abolish the graduate endowment, and the Education (Additional Support for Learning) (Scotland) Act 2009, which made provisions in relation to additional support needs. In December 2009, opposition parties called for Hyslop to be sacked, as Scottish Labour Leader Iain Gray stated that schools were in "crisis". Labour threatened to motion a vote of no-confidence. With an SNP minority government, this made Hyslop almost certain to be ousted from office. Instead, Salmond sacked her from cabinet and she was demoted to a junior minister post of Minister for Culture and External Affairs.

In 2011 election to the 3rd Scottish parliament, Hyslop ran, again, for the Linlithgow constituency. After running twice, she successfully defeated Scottish Labour's Mary Mulligan, gaining the constituency.

Culture Secretary 
Following the SNP's landslide victory in the 2011 election, she was promoted back to cabinet in Salmond's second government as Cabinet Secretary for Culture and External Affairs. In the 2014 Scottish independence referendum, she campaigned in favour of Scottish independence. 

Following the defeat of the Yes campaign in the referendum, Salmond resigned as First Minister and leader of the SNP. Nicola Sturgeon succeeded Salmond and Hyslop remained in Sturgeon's new cabinet. She added Europe onto her portfolio as Cabinet Secretary for Culture, Europe and External Affairs. In the 2016 EU Referendum, she campaigned to remain within the European Union, as she stated there would be 'huge economic uncertainty'. In 2020, she added economy onto her portfolio as Cabinet Secretary for Economy, Fair Work and Culture.

Backbencher 
Hyslop was re-elected to the Scottish Parliament in the 2021 election. Prior to Nicola Sturgeon's cabinet reshuffle, she announced that she would stand down from government, having served 14 years. As a backbencher, she is serving as Deputy Convener of the Scottish Parliament's Economy and Fair Work Committee and is a member of the Net Zero, Energy and Transport Committee.

Personal life
Hyslop lives in Linlithgow with her husband and their three children. She met her husband, Kenneth Anderson, through the SNP and they both tied the knot in 1994.

See also
First Salmond government
Second Salmond government
List of foreign ministers in 2017

Notes

References

External links
Official website
 

|-

|-

|-

|-

1964 births
Living people
People from Irvine, North Ayrshire
People educated at Ayr Academy
Alumni of the University of Glasgow
Alumni of Heriot-Watt University
Scottish National Party MSPs
Members of the Scottish Parliament 1999–2003
Members of the Scottish Parliament 2003–2007
Members of the Scottish Parliament 2007–2011
Members of the Scottish Parliament 2011–2016
Members of the Scottish Parliament 2016–2021
Members of the Scottish Parliament 2021–2026
Members of the Scottish Cabinet
Women members of the Scottish Government
20th-century Scottish women politicians
People from Linlithgow